Huanan could refer to:

South China (華南)
Huanan County (桦南县), Heilongjiang
Huanan Town (桦南镇), seat of Huanan County
Huanan Bridge (华南大桥), in Guangzhou
Huanan Seafood Wholesale Market, in Wuhan, suspected source of COVID-19